Jasrana is a nagar panchayat (a form of an urban political unit in India comparable to a municipality) in Firozabad district in the Indian state of Uttar Pradesh

Geography and atmosphere
It has an average elevation of 169 metres (554 feet).

Demographics
 India census, Jasrana had a population of 15567. Males constitute 53% of the population and females 47%. Jasrana has an average literacy rate of 47%,  In Jasrana, 16% of the population is under 6 years of age.

References

Cities and towns in Firozabad district